Ahmet Güneştekin (born December 22, 1966) is a visual artist of Kurdish descent, whose works span painting, conceptual art and constructions sculpture. For Ahmet Güneştekin, a self-taught artist, art is a passion which has driven him since his childhood. He left the town of Batman for Istanbul in 1991, but had to wait several years before he found his own style at the beginning of the 2000s. He then abandoned the figurative to launch himself into a “narrative abstraction”. This kind of production is loaded with the recollection of a vernacular art, the memory of motifs such as carpets, lamps, Ottoman copperware in which geometry is the leading force.

Güneştekin uses a unique technique with an individual method and precision. After establishing a complex web of black acrylic paint, he fills each of the small spaces with a layer of oil paint, ranging from the light to the dark. Then, using a sort of pen with a rubber tip, he engraves into the paint, and writes as a calligrapher would on a book. He writes on his paintings by removing material, a principle which has more in common with sculpture than painting.

After the agreement he signed with the London-based Marlborough Gallery – one of the world’s top five reputable galleries – in 2013, Ahmet Güneştekin made room for himself in the international art market.  Marlborough’s first move was to open an exhibition in the same timeframe as the 55th Venice Biennial. When Massimiliano Gioni, listed Güneştekin’s ‟Momentum of Memory” exhibition among the ‟Top 10 exhibitions to see,” the media couldn’t remain indifferent. Güneştekin’s works appeared in high circulation Italian dailies such as Il Manifesto, La Repubblica, La Stampa. Naturally, his works drew the attention of the art circle.  
         
In November 2013, Marlborough Gallery opened its doors in New York to Güneştekin. After making a flamboyant introduction for Güneştekin with a solo exhibition, “Ahmet Güneştekin: Recent Paintings” between 26 November and 4 January 2014, Marlborough Gallery prepared an intensive program for 2014. The exhibitions that began in January with Arco Madrid was followed by the New York Armory Show, Art Breda, and Art Basel Hong Kong. Afterward Marlborough Monaco Gallery opened a solo exhibition by Ahmet Güneştekin from 18 September to 14 November. His works are on display at the Marlborough Galleries in Barcelona, Madrid, Monaco and New York at their permanent exhibition halls all the year round.

Güneştekin’s works can be briefly described as the interpretation of the oral narratives, legends and mythology from Anatolian, Mesopotamian and Greek civilizations using free technique. He creates optical and vibrant works, with the solar disc as one of his occurring motifs. The figurative way of expression is present in all his oeuvres, even though in an abstract stylized way. In all his contemporaneous works, the characters, symbols and scenes are taken out of ancient times, and these characters are symbolic, woven into symbolic tales about the essential questions of mankind.

Style and technique 

Ahmet Güneştekin realizes his works by adopting diverse methods. Gradient optics, dimensional canvases, flat canvases, sun explosions and installations expose his main approach that is to stay out of conventional practices applied on canvas. His art works are composed of charming colours, intricately combined layers, and the tales of the ancient times. The Kurdish artist thinks that mythology is the source of all beginnings. Yedizim, as of a dualist religion, has first emerged in the ancient Mesopotamia, rests on the belief that people make distinctions between the good and the evil. The narratives of the culture and its peculiar imitations spontaneously offer precise choices.

However, Güneştekin aims not only to convey messages, also he tries to reveal his own mythology and truths, by expressing himself painting and narrating the diversity of the culture. The characters of the myths he draw are also the ancient characters of the Greek mythology. For Güneştekin, there actually appears no difference between Shahmeran, one of the ancient mythological creatures of Mesopotamia and Medusa in Greek mythology. The effect of embroidery can be best observed in artist’s recent paintings. The drawings and the circles are combined in one geometric structure, and the uses of the colours radically effect the eye. They also provide a narrative, for the symbols and emotions put forward all these elements in the paintings. The refined and meticulously cultivated colour palettes and drawings which they have comprised in harmony are the base of Güneştekin’s works.

Mesopotamia, where the artist was born, and Anatolia, the mythological creatures such as Phoenix or the Peacock Angel, form Güneştekin’s most important source of inspiration. The glowing sun marks his peculiar signature. His method of oil painting is a model that reveals itself in adopting embroiderer’s patient work that is to knit and adorn, and to make a drawing model out of it. The diverse uses of the light, the thickness of the lines and the colours, and their density pave the way to gross geometric forms. His oil paintings are the outcome of a hard and dense work process, and give the impression that they are magnified by sculpturing. His colossal works and his paintings resemble the historical art works that are consist of archaeological fragments and figures. However, the most enchanting form he adopts is the glitter of his genuine light globes.

For Ahmet Güneştekin's gallery visit the site: www.ahmetgunestekin.com

Exhibitions

Solo exhibitions 

2022
 
 Foreigner Quarter (Gâvur Mahallesi), Izmir, Turkey
 
2021
 
 Memory Room (Hafıza Odası), Diyarbakır, Turkey

2014

 Contemporary Istanbul ’14, Marlborough Gallery, Istanbul. Turkey.
 The Heir to the Solar Disk, Marlborough Monaco, Monaco.
 KunstRAI Amsterdam, Mark Peet Visser Gallery, Amsterdam, The Netherlands.
 Faces of the Sun, Mark Peet Visser Gallery, Den Bosch, The Netherlands.
 Ahmet Güneştekin: Recent Paintings, Marlborough Gallery, New York, United States.

2013

 Momentum of Memory, Arsenale Docks, Venice, Italy.
 Encounter Ankara, CerModern, Ankara, Turkey.
 Contemporary Istanbul ‘13, (represented by Marlborough Gallery), Istanbul, Turkey.

2012
 
 Encounter Istanbul, Antrepo 3, Istanbul, Turkey.
 Carpet and Rug Design, Armaggan Art & Design Gallery, Istanbul, Turkey.
 A Lot, Güler Art Gallery, Ankara, Turkey.
 Intersections / Transformation, Santral Istanbul, Istanbul, Turkey.
 Contemporary Istanbul ‘12, Mim Art Gallery, Istanbul, Turkey.
 
2010 – 2011
 
 Pure Justice, Contemporary Istanbul ‘11, (represented by Gallery Baraz), Istanbul, Turkey. 
 Doors Opening to the Sun, Contemporary Istanbul ‘10, (represented by Gallery Baraz), Istanbul, Turkey. 
 Immortality, Casa Dell’Arte Art Gallery, Istanbul, Turkey. 
 
2009
 
 Elixir, Çırağan Palace Kempinski Art Gallery, Istanbul, Turkey.
 Immortality Gate, Contemporary Istanbul ‘09, (represented by Casa Dell’Arte Art Gallery), Istanbul, Turkey.
 Contemporary I, Painting and Sculpture Exhibition, Bali Art Gallery, Istanbul, Turkey.
 
2007- 2008
 
 The Fall of Troya, Contemporary Istanbul ‘08, (represented by Çağla Cabaoğlu Gallery), Istanbul, Turkey.
 Antique Modern, Contemporary Istanbul ‘07, (represented by Çağla Cabaoğlu Gallery), Istanbul, Turkey.
 Civilizations Born in the Footsteps of the Sun, AKM, Istanbul, Turkey.
 
2005- 2006
 
 Sîmûrg, Contemporary Istanbul ‘06, (represented by Gallery Baraz), Istanbul, Turkey.
 Aura, Toprak Art Gallery, Istanbul, Turkey.
 Sun Dance, Garage of Art, Istanbul, Turkey.
 Love in Mesopotamia, Atakule Vakıfbank Art Gallery, Ankara, Turkey.
 
2003 – 2004

 Gallery Artist, Istanbul, Turkey.
 The Colors after Darkness, AKM, Istanbul, Turkey.

Group exhibitions 

2014
 
 Art Market Budapest, Güler Sanat, Budapest, Hungary.
 Summer Show, Marlborough Gallery, Madrid, Spain.
 Art Basel Hong Kong, Marlborough Gallery, Hong Kong.
 Art Breda, Mark Peet Visser Gallery, Breda, The Netherlands.
 The Armory Show, Marlborough Gallery, New York, United States.
 Arco Madrid, Marlborough Gallery, Madrid, Spain.

2013

 Art Basel Miami Beach, Marlborough Gallery, Miami, United States.
 Art Market Budapest, Güler Art, Budapest, Hungary.
 Sconfinamenti, Spoleto56 Festival, (curated by Achille Bonito Oliva), Spoleto, Italy.
 
2011 – 2012

 Sergüzeşt, Güler Art Gallery, Ankara, Turkey.
 Summer Exhibition, Antrepo 5, (Gallery Beyaz), Istanbul, Turkey.

Catalogue articles 

Stéphanie Pioda, The Heir to the Solar Disk, Marlborough Gallery Inc., Monaco, September, 2014.

Bertjan ter Braak, Faces of the Sun, Mark Peet Visser Gallery, Den Bosch, The Netherlands, April, 2014.

Donald Kuspit, The Uses of Mysticism: Ahmet Güneştekin’s Abstractions, Marlborough Gallery, New York, November, 2013.

Beral Madra, Momentum of Memory, GSM Publications, Istanbul, May 2013.

Johannes Odenthal, Abstraction and Mythos, Anatolia’s Cultural Memory within Contemporary Art: About Ahmet Güneştekin’s Artworks, GSM Publications, Istanbul, September, 2012.

Yalçın Sadak, Following the Traces of Sun: A Myth Ahmet Güneştekin, GSM Publications, Istanbul, November, 2010.

Kaya Özsezgin, Authentic Archaism in Ahmet Güneştekin’s Paintings, GSM Publications, Istanbul, November, 2009.

Gülseli İnal, Antique Modern, GSM Publications, Istanbul, March, 2007.

Following the Traces of the Sun with the Masters 

Ahmet Güneştekin traced and compiled ancient myths, oral narratives and legends of Anatolia and Mesopotamia as of 1997. He took excursions to the villages and towns of Anatolia and Mesopotamia and conducted in-depth researches since 2003. He set up art exhibitions in the historical sights and public spaces together with many artists from contemporary art, sculpture and photography. The series of the exhibition titled Following the Traces of the Sun with the Masters brought about his first major exhibition, The Colors after Darkness.

Documentary films 

Güneştekin became the art director of the news show Haberci, produced and directed by Coşkun Aral in 2005. Afterwards he produces his own documentary series titled Following the Traces of the Sun for TRT 1 and the series came to be the first documentary films to focus on art in Turkey.

Children's art classes 

In his excursions to Anatolia and Mesopotamia, Ahmet Güneştekin provided painting classes to the children so that they can learn how to express themselves in visual arts. In classes, Güneştekin taught children about art concepts and techniques by exposing them to many different kinds of art materials. Güneştekin met over 5,000 children and introduced them the world of painting.

References

External links 

 Ahmet Güneştekin Official Website

Turkish male sculptors
Turkish conceptual artists
1966 births
Living people
20th-century Turkish people
20th-century Turkish painters
21st-century Turkish people
21st-century Turkish painters
Turkish male painters